Boritokay Township (بۆرىتوقاي يېزىسى / ) is a township of Wuqia County in Kizilsu Kyrgyz Autonomous Prefecture, Xinjiang Uygur Autonomous Region, China. It has 5 villages under its jurisdiction. Its seat is at Dongengiz .

Boritokay Township is located 86 kilometers south of the county seat Wuqia Town. It is adjacent to Shufu County in the east, Bostanterak Township in the south, Akto County in the southwest, and Oksalur Township in the north.

Name
The name "Boritokay" is from the Kyrgyz language. The word "bori" (膘尔) means wolf and the word "tokay" (托阔依) means forest, brush or grassy area. According to legend, there was a forest/grassland/brushland in Boritokay in which wolves roamed and hence the area was called Boritokay, meaning "forest/grassland/brushland with wolves in it". Xinjiang Tuzhi mentions a Biaolituohai in the western part of Shufu, in the area of Boritokay.

History
Boritokay was the 5th township of the 3rd district	 in Wuqia County in 1950.  It was part of Bostanterak Commune  in 1958 and Boritokay Commune  was formed from Bostanterak Commune in 1962,  it was renamed Jinsong Commune  in 1968 and restored the original name in 1980, and organized as a township in 1984.

Geography
The township is located between 1,700 meters and 2,800 meters above sea level, most of which are mountainous areas.

Settlements
The township has 5 administration villages and 21  unincorporated villages under its jurisdiction.

5 administration villages:
 Akqi Village (Aheqi)
 Aygart Village (Ayiga'erte, Ayi Ga’ertecun) 
 Boritokay Village (Biao'ertuokuoyi), also named Dongengiz, (Dun'ai'ezi)
 Saz Village (Sazi)
 Targalak Village (Ta'ergalake)

Economy
It is a township of semi-agriculture and semi-animal husbandry. Local wildlife include Argali, wolves, snow chicken, stone chicken, yellow sheep and so on. Ginseng and angelica grow in the area. Mineral resources include gold, copper, fossil oil and so on. The township has an area of 469.7 hectares of arable land, 355.7 hectares of forest land and 1,677 hectares of natural grassland. All the 5 villages in the township pass through the asphalt road, and mobile communication covers all the villages. There are 2 primary schools, 4 kindergartens, 1 health center, 5 clinics and 29 medical staff in the township.

References

External links

 “90后”干部周龙扶贫帕米尔 （Translation: '"Post-90s" cadre Zhou Long works to alleviate poverty in the Pamirs'. As of 2020, Zhou Long is Boritokay township deputy chief; Zhou is in charge of township poverty alleviation efforts.) 
 Vlog 柯尔克孜族牧民下山记 (2020) 

Township-level divisions of Wuqia County